Milan Susak (born 29 January 1984) is an Australian retired footballer who last played for Yangon United as a defender. He is currently a trainer at the youth soccer team of western Sydney.

Club career

Early years
Susak is also of Serbian descent. He penned a one-year deal on 26 July 2007 after impressing coach Aurelio Vidmar in pre-season games against Melbourne and Perth.

Susak's previous club was FK Vojvodina in the Meridian Superliga in Serbia and Montenegro, for whom he made 22 appearances having also played on loan in two lower league clubs, FK Veternik and FK ČSK Čelarevo.

In April 2008, he was able to go out on a high by playing the full 90 minutes of Adelaide's successful Asian Champions League campaign while not conceding a goal to allow the Reds to advance to the quarter finals of the competition.

On 5 June 2008, Susak signed a one-year contract with the German club SpVgg Unterhaching with the option of another year after being recommended for a trial by fellow Australian Paul Agostino.

After two years at Unterhaching he returned home and signed for Brisbane Roar in the A-League In the same year he won the Premiership and Championship going undefeated in 26 matches.

In 2011, he stated on his Twitter account that he signed a loan deal with Liga Primer Indonesia outfit Minangkabau FC.

On 27 September 2011, he signed a two-year contract with his old club Adelaide United returning to Australia after a short stint in Indonesia.

In October 2011, Holger Osieck selected Susak for the upcoming national team training camp.

Later years
In February 2012, it was announced that Chinese Super League club Tianjin Teda had signed Susak for $200,000. He made his official debut for Tianjin on 25 February, in a 2–1 CFA Super Cup defeat against Guangzhou Evergrande. On 5 December 2012, he signed a contract with Iranian champions Sepahan.

Susak is the only Australian footballer who has played in three Asian Champions League campaign's with three clubs in different countries.

In June 2013 it was announced that UAE Pro League club Al Wasl had signed Susak from Sepahan for an estimated $500,000 transfer fee.

East Bengal
In November 2014, Susak signed for I-League giant East Bengal for one year. He said that he wanted to win trophies for the club besides the opportunity to play in the AFC Cup attracted him to join the Kolkatan outfit.

Yangon United
On 10 December 2015, he transferred to Yangon United FC.

Club statistics

Honours
Brisbane Roar
 A-League Premiership: 2010–11
 A-League Championship: 2010–11

Sepahan
 Hazfi Cup Winner: 2012–13

References

External links
 OzFootball profile

1984 births
Living people
Australian people of Serbian descent
Australian expatriate soccer players
Australian expatriate sportspeople in Iran
A-League Men players
3. Liga players
Sydney Olympic FC players
Adelaide United FC players
Brisbane Roar FC players
Bonnyrigg White Eagles FC players
FK Vojvodina players
FK ČSK Čelarevo players
Expatriate footballers in Serbia
Expatriate footballers in Indonesia
SpVgg Unterhaching players
Expatriate footballers in Germany
Tianjin Jinmen Tiger F.C. players
Chinese Super League players
Expatriate footballers in China
Australian expatriate sportspeople in China
Australian expatriate sportspeople in Germany
Expatriate footballers in Iran
Al-Wasl F.C. players
Expatriate footballers in the United Arab Emirates
Australian expatriate sportspeople in the United Arab Emirates
Association football defenders
Australian expatriate sportspeople in Serbia and Montenegro
Expatriate footballers in Serbia and Montenegro
Soccer players from Sydney
Sportsmen from New South Wales
UAE Pro League players
Bonnyrigg White Eagles FC managers
Australian soccer coaches
Australian soccer players